Shrule, sometimes called Abbeyshrule, is a barony in County Longford, Republic of Ireland.

Etymology
Shrule takes its name from Abbeyshrule (Irish Mainistir Shruthla, "abbey by the stream").

Location

Shrule is located in southeast County Longford, on the lower reaches of the River Inny.

History
Shrule barony was formed from was formed from parts of the territories of Moybrawne (Shrule), Clanconnor and Muintergalgan. Moybrawne was anciently part of a territory known as Bregmaine, or Mag Bregmaine, in Cenél Maine.

List of settlements

Below is a list of settlements in Shrule:
Abbeyshrule
Forgney
Taghshinny

References

Baronies of County Longford